The 2002–03 season, was the Guildford Flames' eleventh year of ice hockey. The Guildford Flames competed in the British National League.

Player statistics

Netminders

Schedule And Results

Challenge Matches

British National League (BNL) 
Final Standings

British National League play-offs 
Quarter-Final Group A

Quarter-Final Group B

Findus Cup 
Qualifying Round - Southern Group

Qualifying Round - Northern Group

External links 
 Official Guildford Flames website

References 

Guildford Flames seasons
2002–03 in English ice hockey